XHE-FM/XEE-AM is an FM-AM combo radio station that serves the state of Durango, Mexico, with Radio Fórmula programming.

History
XEE is the oldest radio station in Durango. It received its concession on November 24, 1933, but did not come to air until June 27, 1934. XEE broadcast from the residence of its first owner, Alejandro O. Stevenson, with 50 watts on 1010 kHz. The station's opening featured Lázaro Cárdenas, then running for president, as well as Governor Carlos Real and the local military commander, Anacleto López. By the 1940s, XEE had expanded its programming and was operating on a new frequency, 1280; in 1943, Stevenson had transferred the station to José G. Valenzuela. In 1961, Alicia Stevenson Torrijos bought XEE, moving it to 590 and increasing its daytime power to 1,000 watts.

In 1993, XEE was sold to Radio XEE, S.A. de C.V., which in 1994 converted the station into a combo by receiving authorization to build XHE-FM 105.3. Radio Fórmula acquired XEE-XHE in 2000.

External links

References

Radio stations in Durango
Mass media in Durango City
Radio Fórmula